Death Train (also known as Detonator) is a 1993 American made-for-television action-thriller disaster film featuring Pierce Brosnan, Patrick Stewart, Christopher Lee, Ted Levine, and Alexandra Paul. The script was based on an Alastair MacNeill novel of the same name, which in turn was based on an Alistair MacLean screenplay.

Plot
With the aid of a German nuclear physicist, dissident Russian General Konstantin Benin (Christopher Lee), a military casualty of the Soviet collapse, is conspiring to restore the Soviet Union to superpower status. His plan is to place a nuclear bomb on a train controlled by mercenaries, led by Alex Tierney (Ted Levine), bound for Iraq, forcing the Russian army to invade Iraq to recover it and once again mobilize its might - creating a new military union in the process. Malcolm Philpott (Patrick Stewart), the head of the United Nations Anti-Crime Organisation (UNACO), entrusts the mission of stopping the train and its deadly cargo to a multinational team led by field operative Mike Graham (Pierce Brosnan) and information analyst Sabrina Carver (Alexandra Paul) who are forced to form a reluctant partnership as the international balance of power hits crisis point.

Cast
 Pierce Brosnan as Mike Graham
 Patrick Stewart as Malcolm Philpott
 Alexandra Paul as Sabrina Carver
 Ted Levine as Alex Tierney
 Christopher Lee as General Konstantin Benin
 John Abineri as Dr. Karl Leitzig
 Clarke Peters as C.W. Whitlock
 Nick D'Avirro as Major Gennadi Rodenko
 Andreas Jung as Lt. Sergei Kolchinsky

Novel
MacLean had written a number of unfinished storylines before he died in 1987. These were fleshed out in novel form by Alistair MacNeill: Death Train and Night Watch. One review of Death Train said "MacLean fans have to wonder just how much of the detail is indeed his. For example, MacLean's heroes are traditionally thrown on their own wits to survive in sticky situations. Death Train’s three agents are rarely tested this way, and yell for help when the going gets tough. Having Big Brother step in on cue with its muscle is no substitute for imaginative heroics".

In 1991 a Warwickshire Council trading standards department sued the publisher of the novels claiming misleading advertising, in part because MacLean's name featured in bigger type on the book cover than MacNeill's. In September the publishers were fined £6,250 for misleading advertising. By that stage they had sold 355,000 copies of MacNeill's first two novels.

When a third MacNeill novel, Time of the Assassins, came out in late 1991 the cover art was amended so MacNeill's name was as large as MacLean's.

Locations 
Film rights were bought by USA Pictures, an off shot of the USA Network. They would make films for screening on the USA Network in the US but which could be shown theatrically in other territories. Death Train was the first in a slate of four pictures.

It was the first project Brosnan made following the death of his wife. In Brosnan's words: "It's boy's own adventure. It's everything I've wanted to do - run along the top of trains, shoot guns and climb in and out of helicopters".

The film was shot entirely on location in Slovenia and at Jadran Film Studios, Zagreb, Croatia as a co-production between Yorkshire International Films Ltd., and Jadran Film. Filming finished by June 1992. The country was in turmoil at the time due to the Yugoslavian wars. Brosnan said it was "a heightened exhilaration in a lot of ways because the hotel we were staying in was overrun by soldiers. The combat outfits that we wore were just like the Croatian army, which seems to be a hodgepodge of uniforms. At times, going to work was like going to the front because it was very tough (to shoot)".

Reception
The film was popular at the box office in England but debuted in the US on the USA Network.

Home media
The film was released on by New Line Home Video on VHS tape in the US as "Detonator" in 1993.

The Region 2 UK DVD release (by Prism Leisure) of Death Train lacks English subtitles for the Russian dialogue. The scenes with Russian dialogue are meant to be hard-subbed, as was the case with TV broadcast, VHS, and the Region 1 American DVD versions.

Sequel
Pierce Brosnan and Alexandra Paul returned for the sequel Detonator II: Night Watch. Night Watch is available on Region 1 DVD both individually and bundled as a double pack with Death Train.

References

External links 
 

1993 television films
1993 films
1993 action thriller films
1990s disaster films
Action television films
British television films
Disaster television films
Films about mercenaries
Films about nuclear war and weapons
Films based on British novels
Films based on thriller novels
Films based on works by Alistair MacLean
Films set in insular areas of the United States
Films set in Germany
Films set in Austria
Films set in Russia
Films shot in Croatia
Rail transport films
American thriller television films
USA Network original films
Television series by ITV Studios
Television series by Yorkshire Television
Films directed by David Jackson (director)
1990s American films